Lesslie Clay Viguerie is an American attorney and career diplomat who serves as the United States ambassador to Kyrgyzstan since December 2022.

Education 
Viguerie earned a Bachelor of Arts in international relations and affairs from George Washington University in 1982 and a Juris Doctor from the Columbus School of Law at the Catholic University of America.

Career 
Viguerie is a career member of the Senior Foreign Service, with the rank of minister-counselor. He serves as the Deputy Assistant Secretary for Central Asian and Pakistan affairs in the Bureau of South and Central Asian Affairs. Previously, he was Deputy Chief of Mission at the U.S. Embassy in Tashkent, Uzbekistan, and served as minister-counselor for political affairs at the U.S. Embassy in New Delhi, India. Viguerie was also director for Europe and Asia in the Bureau of International Narcotics and Law Enforcement Affairs and Director for Central Asia in the Bureau of South and Central Asia Affairs. Previous overseas assignments include Deputy Political Counselor for the U.S. Embassy in New Delhi, Senior Director of the Interagency Rule of Law Section for the U.S. Embassy in Kabul, and external political relations chief for the U.S. Embassy in Moscow. Viguerie has also served in the United Nations Department of Political and Peacebuilding Affairs.

Viguerie is an expert on Central Asia and an advocate for effective policy. He is a member of the District of Columbia Bar.

United States ambassador to Kyrgyzstan
On February 25, 2022, President Joe Biden nominated Viguerie to serve as the United States ambassador to Kyrgyzstan. Hearings on his nomination were held before the Senate Foreign Relations Committee on July 27, 2022. He was confirmed on September 29, 2022. He presented his credentials to President Sadyr Japarov on December 29, 2022.

Awards and recognitions
Viguerie has received numerous State Department performance awards, including a Senior Foreign Service Performance award.

Personal life
Viguerie is a native of Virginia. He speaks Russian, Hindi, and Portuguese.

References 

Living people
American diplomats
George Washington University alumni
Catholic University of America alumni
Columbus School of Law alumni
United States Foreign Service personnel
United States Department of State officials
Year of birth missing (living people)
Ambassadors of the United States to Kyrgyzstan